New Zealand political leader Jim Bolger assembled a "shadow cabinet" within the National Party caucus after his election to the position of Leader of the Opposition in 1986. He composed this of individuals who acted for the party as spokespeople in assigned roles while he was Leader of the Opposition (1986–90).

As the National Party formed the largest party not in government at the time, the frontbench team was as a result the Official Opposition within the New Zealand House of Representatives.

List of shadow ministers

Frontbench teams
The lists below contains an outlay of Bolger's shadow ministers and their respective roles.

April 1986
Bolger announced his first shadow cabinet in April 1986 just over a week after he replaced Jim McLay as party leader. He made significant changes, particularly a rapprochement with Sir Robert Muldoon who accepted the Foreign Affairs portfolio.

September 1987
Bolger reshuffled his shadow cabinet on 11 September 1987 following National's defeat at the 1987 general election. The first twenty members are given rankings with an extended group of junior members who are unranked.

February 1990
Bolger announced a major reshuffle on 11 February 1990 ahead of the general election later that year and to reflect the MPs who were intending to retire at the election.

Notes

References

New Zealand National Party
Bolger, Jim
1986 establishments in New Zealand
1990 disestablishments in New Zealand